The Queensland Railways 6D13½ Abt class locomotive was a class of 0-6-0T steam locomotives operated by the Queensland Railways.

History
In October 1900, two Dübs & Co locomotives entered service. Per Queensland Railway's classification system they were designated the 6D13½ Abt class, the 6 representing the number of driving wheels, the D that it was a tank locomotive, and the 13½ the cylinder diameter in inches.

They were built to assist conventional locomotives up and down a steeply graded rack railway section of the Central Western line at Mount Morgan. In 1906 a further pair were built by the North British Locomotive Company with a further two delivered in 1915. One of the original pair was condemned in 1926, with the remaining five withdrawn when the steeply graded section was bypassed in 1952. The only time the locomotives strayed from Mount Morgan was when sent to Rockhampton for overhaul.

Class list

References

Dübs locomotives
NBL locomotives
Rack and cog driven locomotives
Railway locomotives introduced in 1900
6D13
0-6-0T locomotives
3 ft 6 in gauge locomotives of Australia